Swecker is a surname. Notable people with the surname include:

Chris Swecker (born 1956), American lawyer, FBI executive
Dan Swecker (1947–2021), American politician